Willet is a species of bird.

Willet may also refer to: 

Willet (name)
 USS Willet (AM-54),  Lapwing-class minesweeper commissioned by the United States Navy for service after World War I
 Willet (band), American Christian rock band
 Willet, New York, United States
 Willet, Wisconsin, ghost town, United States

See also 
 Willett (disambiguation)